Elizabeth Tulloch (born January 19, 1981) known as Bitsie Tulloch, is an American actress. She is known for her roles as Juliette Silverton / Eve in the NBC television series Grimm and as Lois Lane in The CW superhero television series Superman & Lois.

Early life
Tulloch was born in San Diego, California, and grew up in Spain, Uruguay, and Argentina. Tulloch goes by "Bitsie", which is not a contraction of her given name, Elizabeth, but a homage to her oddly-nicknamed grandfather, a World War II bomber pilot, who was also involved in the 1961 Goldsboro B-52 crash.

When Tulloch began acting she was credited as "Bitsie" and continued to be until 2017 when she decided to start using Elizabeth instead, explaining: "I still go by Bitsie. I still introduce myself as Bitsie to people I meet. But, it sort of worked when I was in my mid-20s and I was just starting acting. And now I'm in my mid-30s, and I felt like, for billing purposes, I wanted to go back to Elizabeth. I was doing a movie... and it actually hadn't even occurred to me. And the producer was, like, "Hey, we noticed it's Elizabeth when we were filling out your legal papers. Is that the way you want billing?" And I just thought about it, and I called my agent and my manager, and they were like, "Yeah, you know, that's not a bad idea. You are older now. And Bitsie is, obviously, a very kind of cute name. It's cutesy." So, that's really all it was about. It's not like I introduce myself as Elizabeth now. It's just for billing, going forward."

Tulloch is of Scottish and Spanish ancestry.

Tulloch has stated her first language was Spanish although she no longer considers herself completely fluent. Her paternal grandmother's family is from Renfrewshire and her grandfather's family originated from the area around Kirkwall, both in Scotland. In an interview with BBC News, she reported that "we think the first Tulloch came to the US around 1880 and the Kerrs came in the early 1900s. After returning to the U.S., she went to middle and high school in Bedford, New York. Tulloch graduated magna cum laude from Harvard University with a double major in English and American Literature and Visual and Environmental Studies.

Career

Film and theater

Tulloch's first acting credit was as R2-D2's "girlfriend" in R2-D2: Beneath the Dome, a mockumentary produced by George Lucas telling the life story of the fictional robot R2-D2 from the Star Wars film series. She starred as "Sally" in the premiere of Sam Forman's play, Quarterlife, which opened at the Pico Playhouse in March 2006. The Los Angeles Times wrote, "Superbly performed... the scene at the end of the play, between Sally (Bitsie Tulloch) and Jack (Clark Freeman), was heartbreaking and beautiful... The lead actress, Bitsie Tulloch, [was] absolutely brilliant."

She was in Lakeview Terrace directed by Neil LaBute, opposite Samuel L. Jackson, Kerry Washington, and Patrick Wilson, and worked with Barbara Hershey on a film called Uncross the Stars. In the fall of 2009 she filmed the romantic comedy Losing Control. Tulloch voiced one of the characters, a wolf called Sweets, in Alpha and Omega, a 3-D computer animated film, which was released in September 2010.

Tulloch played the small role of Norma, an actress in the 1920s starring in a silent movie with a veteran actor, in the award-winning movie The Artist with Jean Dujardin, John Goodman and James Cromwell, which was released by The Weinstein Company in November 2011, and won the 2012 Academy Award for Best Picture. The cast of the movie was nominated for a Critics' Choice Award for Best Ensemble Cast.

In 2012 she starred as one of the titular roles in independent film Caroline and Jackie opposite Marguerite Moreau, which she also co-produced. The film premiered at the Tribeca Film Festival in April 2012, and was released theatrically in May 2013.

Tulloch played Marilyn Sitzman, a witness to the Kennedy assassination, in the 2013 film Parkland, opposite Paul Giamatti, Billy Bob Thornton, Marcia Gay Harden, Jacki Weaver, Jackie Earle Haley, and Zac Efron. The film was produced by Tom Hanks and Gary Goetzman of Playtone, and was released in 2013, to coincide with the 50th anniversary of John F. Kennedy's assassination.

Television

Tulloch has appeared on the television shows House, Cold Case, The West Wing, Moonlight, and Outlaw. In 2007, she filmed a role as a Dharma initiative scientist for the ABC series Lost, but her role was re-cast due to scheduling conflicts with quarterlife.

Tulloch played the lead role in Ed Zwick and Marshall Herskovitz's drama quarterlife, which premiered on NBC in early 2008. While the series was quickly pulled and moved to Bravo, Tulloch was hailed for her performance. The Los Angeles Times wrote: "She's the best realized of the bunch... Tulloch, who plays her, seems destined to be better known." She was often lauded as the "next" Claire Danes: "Will this be the first online show to create a real star? It looks likely: The gorgeous 26-year-old Tulloch clearly possesses Danes-like smarts and magnetism."

In 2009, Tulloch shot one of the three leads in HBO's buzzed-about comedy pilot Washingtonienne based on the book by Jessica Cutler. The pilot was produced by HBO and Sarah Jessica Parker. In early 2010, she filmed Most Likely to Succeed, a half-hour comedy pilot for Imagine Entertainment through the FOX network, and had a recurring role on NBC's Outlaw.

Tulloch was a series regular on the NBC series Grimm (2011–2017). She played the role of Juliette Silverton / Eve in the fantasy police procedural drama set in a world where characters inspired by Grimms' Fairy Tales exist. Tulloch's heritage and fluency with the Spanish language were written into the role.

Tulloch played Lois Lane in The CW Arrowverse crossover events "Elseworlds" in 2018 and "Crisis on Infinite Earths" in 2019. The executive producers described the character as "dogged, determined and brave". In 2021, Tulloch and Tyler Hoechlin reprised their roles as Lois and Superman in the spinoff television series Superman & Lois.

Personal life
In December 2014, Tulloch confirmed she was in a relationship with her Grimm co-star David Giuntoli. In July 2016, she and Giuntoli revealed they became engaged in April 2016. They were married in June 2017. In October 2018, they confirmed that Tulloch was pregnant with their daughter, who was born in 2019.

During her time living and working in Portland, Oregon (where Grimm was filmed), Tulloch became a fan of the Portland Trail Blazers and was often seen attending games with her co-stars.

Tulloch and Giuntoli maintained two residences, including a 1920s remodeled Dutch Colonial in Portland and a 1920s Spanish house in Hollywood Hills. In January 2020, the family moved to Washington state to be closer to family and their work in Vancouver.

Awards
In early 2012, Tulloch was nominated by the Broadcast Film Critics Association Awards, commonly called the Critics' Choice Awards, for Best Ensemble Cast for The Artist.

Tulloch was nominated for a 28th Annual LA Weekly Theater Award for her performance in Sam Forman's play Quarterlife (March 2007). Quarterlife was an experimental sequence of 20-plus episodes which were originally intended to be released only on the internet, but its success led it to being picked up by NBC.

Filmography

Film

Television

References

External links

 
 
 Elizabeth Tulloch at Rotten Tomatoes

Living people
American film actresses
American television actresses
American web series actresses
American film producers
Harvard College alumni
American expatriates in Spain
21st-century American actresses
American expatriates in Uruguay
American expatriates in Argentina
American women film producers
American people of Scottish descent
American people of Spanish descent
People from Bedford, New York
Actresses from San Diego
Actresses from New York (state)
1981 births